Fletch is a 1985 American neo-noir comedy thriller film directed by Michael Ritchie and written by Andrew Bergman. Based on Gregory Mcdonald's popular Fletch novels, the film stars Chevy Chase as the eponymous character. It co-stars Tim Matheson, Dana Wheeler-Nicholson, Geena Davis and Joe Don Baker.

The film revolves around Los Angeles Times reporter Irwin M. "Fletch" Fletcher, who is offered a large sum of money by a millionaire to kill him, claiming he has a terminal cancer prognosis and suicide would invalidate his life insurance policy. Fletch becomes suspicious when he discovers the man is not ill; when he continues to investigate, his life is threatened.

Fletch did well with critics and at the box office – it was among the top 50 grossing domestic films in its first year of release. It has since developed a cult following and was followed by a 1989 sequel, Fletch Lives. Subsequent decades saw many unsuccessful attempts to restart or reboot the series; another Fletch film, Confess, Fletch starring Jon Hamm, was finally produced in 2022.

Plot
Los Angeles Times undercover reporter Irwin M. "Fletch" Fletcher (who writes as "Jane Doe") is writing an article exposing drug trafficking on the beaches of Los Angeles. While posing as an addict, he is approached by Boyd Aviation executive vice president Alan Stanwyk, who assumes Fletch is a real junkie. Stanwyk claims to have bone cancer with only months left to live, and wishes to avoid the suffering. Stanwyk offers $50,000 for Fletch to kill him at his mansion in a few days' time, stage the scene as a burglary, then flee to Rio de Janeiro.

Fletch, not completely convinced of the truth of Stanwyk's story, agrees to the plan. Along with his colleague Larry, he begins investigating Stanwyk instead of completing his drug exposé, much to the chagrin of his authoritarian editor Frank Walker. Disguised as a doctor, Fletch accesses Stanwyk's file at the hospital and learns he does not have cancer.

Fletch visits Stanwyk's wife Gail at her tennis club. Pretending to be a tennis instructor and Alan's friend, he flirts with her during a tennis lesson. Looking into Stanwyk's finances, Fletch finds that Gail recently converted $3 million of her personal stock in Boyd Aviation into cash for her husband, to buy a ranch in Provo, Utah. Fletch travels to Provo and breaks into the realtor's office and discovers the sale price was only $3,000.

Meanwhile, LAPD Chief Jerry Karlin learns of Fletch's drug report. He warns Fletch that the article will jeopardize his undercover operation on the beach. Karlin threatens to kill Fletch unless he agrees to drop the investigation.

At the tennis club, Fletch witnesses arrogant club member Mr. Underhill shouting at a waiter, and decides as revenge to use Underhill's tab to treat Gail to an expensive lunch in her private cabana. Fletch reveals Alan's murder scheme to her and tells her the true price of the ranch.

Fletch watches Stanwyk making a suspicious briefcase exchange with Chief Karlin, but is unable to deduce the nature of their meeting. When he is chased by LAPD officers lying in wait at his apartment, Fletch goes into hiding, returning to Provo. Posing as an insurance investigator, he interviews Stanwyk's parents, learning that Stanwyk has been married to another woman for eight years; his bigamous marriage to Gail allowed him access to her vast wealth.

Fletch arrives at Stanwyk's mansion on the night of the planned murder, but finds Stanwyk waiting to kill him instead. Fletch reveals his discovery of Stanwyk's real plan to fake his own death by killing Fletch (whose skeletal build is similar to Stanwyk's) and burning his body beyond recognition, then escape to Brazil with his first wife and Gail's $3 million. Stanwyk was also using his private jet to smuggle drugs from South America to supply Chief Karlin, who blackmailed ex-convicts Fat Sam and Gummy to distribute it on the beaches. Karlin arrives unexpectedly; learning of Stanwyk's intention to flee with nearly $1 million of the Chief's drug money, he kills Stanwyk. Karlin and Fletch fight over the gun until Gail strikes Karlin from behind, rendering him unconscious.

Karlin is indicted after Fletch's article, with testimony from Fat Sam and Gummy. Fletch begins dating Gail, taking her to Rio on Stanwyk's tickets and using Underhill's American Express Card.

Cast

 Chevy Chase as Irwin "Fletch" Fletcher
 Joe Don Baker as Chief Jerry Karlin
 Dana Wheeler-Nicholson as Gail Stanwyk
 Richard Libertini as Frank Walker
 Tim Matheson as Alan Stanwyk
 Beau Starr as Willy
 M. Emmet Walsh as Dr. Dolan
 George Wendt as Fat Sam
 Kenneth Mars as Stanton Boyd
 Geena Davis as Larry
 Bill Henderson as Speaker
 George Wyner as Marvin Gillet
 Larry "Flash" Jenkins as Gummy
 Ralph Seymour as Creasy
 Robert Sorrells as Marvin Stanwyk
 Penny Santon as Velma Stanwyk
 James Avery as Detective #2

The film makes numerous references to Fletch's favorite team, the Los Angeles Lakers, and includes appearances by Lakers player Kareem Abdul-Jabbar and play-by-play announcer Chick Hearn, as themselves.

Production

Development
Following the publication of Gregory Mcdonald's Fletch in 1974, King-Hitzig Productions acquired the novel's film rights. After multiple attempts to get cameras rolling at Columbia Pictures, production on the film stalled and the rights were eventually acquired by producer Jonathan Burrows in 1976.

After Columbia Pictures passed on the film, Burrows shopped the film around at every studio in Hollywood. Trying a new tactic, Burrows submitted the script with a different title and put it in a different colored binder. Despite these efforts, there were still no takers – even Universal Studios, the company who would eventually go on to produce and distribute it. Among the studios that rejected it between 1975 and 1981 were: New Line Cinema, Columbia, 20th Century Fox, United Artists, Warner Bros, AIP, General Cinema, CBS, EMI, Allied artists, NBC, Zanuck/Brown, Universal, Viacom, First Artists, MGM, Pathe, Paramount and Time Life Films.  Burrows credits Michael Douglas (who much earlier was considered for the lead) for having the foresight and wherewithal to get the film made; his half-brother Peter Douglas ultimately co-produced the film through his film production company, Vincent Pictures.

When Mcdonald's Fletch books were optioned, the author retained the right to veto casting choices. He rejected both Burt Reynolds and Mick Jagger as Fletch. When the studio mentioned Chevy Chase as Fletch, Mcdonald agreed, although he had never seen Chase perform.

Throughout the early stages of development, Jeff Bridges, Charles Grodin and Barry Bostwick were among those considered to play Fletch. George Segal was at one point considered, but turned it down. Burrows also wanted Richard Dreyfuss, after Chase initially rejected the part. Years later, Chase told Burrows that he never knew about the original offer and that it was his then manager who rejected it. In a 2004 interview with Entertainment Weekly, Chase confirmed this was his favorite and most successful part.

Chase did not officially agree to take the role until after producer Alan Greisman and screenwriter Andrew Bergman got involved. Mcdonald sent Chase a telegram saying, "I am delighted to abdicate the role of Fletch to you." Bergman remembers that he wrote the screenplay very fast. "I did the first draft in four weeks ... Then there was a certain amount of improv, and something that we used to call dial-a-joke," said Bergman. Phil Alden Robinson also did some uncredited work on the script.

Mcdonald read the script and was angered by the deviations from his original text. He wrote to the studio and listed his many objections. Director Ritchie invited Mcdonald to the set of the film, and took him out to dinner where, according to Mcdonald, "Point by point, he showed me where I was wrong. I was beautifully chewed out."

Filming
Principal photography for Fletch began in May 1984. Parts of the film were shot in Salt Lake City International Airport, Provo and Orem, Utah.

According to actor Tim Matheson, Fletch was Chase's first film performance after cleaning up his drug problem. However, the studio hired director Michael Ritchie to keep Chase in check. During principal photography, Ritchie would do one take sticking close to the script and then another take allowing Chase to ad-lib.

Chase enjoyed the role, because it allowed him to play a wide variety of different characters. He said in an interview, "I love props, like wigs and buck-teeth and glasses. At one point I wear an Afro and play basketball with Kareem Abdul-Jabbar. There were some scenes where I didn't recognize myself." The comedian enjoyed working with director Ritchie, because he gave him the freedom to improvise: "It all began when [costar] Tim Matheson asked me what my name was. Right away, with a straight face: 'Ted Nugent'."

Chase recalls Ritchie as "Very intelligent. Very Tall (6'7"?) Trusting; allowing me so much freedom. Fine filmmaker!"

Post-production
"Chevy was very hot," recalled Bergman. "And the great thing was that Universal always thought Fletch was a hit movie, and they treated it like a hit, even when the first previews weren't that good. They never got frightened. They just said this is a hit, they were selling it like a hit, and then it was a hit. That was a very fun project."

The narration was added during post-production.

Soundtrack

 "Bit by Bit (Theme from Fletch)" — Stephanie Mills  3:38
 "Fletch, Get Outta Town" — Dan Hartman  4:11
 "Running for Love" — John Farnham 2:54
 "Name of the Game" — Dan Hartman  6:02
 "Fletch Theme" — Harold Faltermeyer  3:48
 "A Letter to Both Sides" — The Fixx  3:20
 "Is It Over" — Kim Wilde  3:52
 "Diggin' In" — Harold Faltermeyer  2:44
 "Exotic Skates" — Harold Faltermeyer  3:00
 "Running for Love" [instrumental] — Harold Faltermeyer 2:44

The soundtrack was mastered by Greg Fulginiti at Artisan Sound Recorders.

Release and reception
Fletch was released on May 31, 1985, in 1,225 theaters, debuting at second place behind Rambo: First Blood Part II with a gross of $7 million. It went on to make $50.6 million in North America and $9 million in the rest of the world, for a worldwide total of $59.6 million. The film performed well on home video, earning $24.4 million in rentals.

On review aggregator Rotten Tomatoes, 77% of 31 critics' reviews are positive, with an average rating of 6.8/10. The website's critics consensus reads: "Quotably funny – and fast-paced enough to smooth over the jokes that don't land – Fletch is one of the best big-screen vehicles for Chevy Chase's brand of smug silliness". On Metacritic, it has a score of 68% based on reviews from 11 critics, indicating "generally favorable reviews". Film critic Roger Ebert gave the film two-and-a-half stars out of four. While the plot and supporting cast were praiseworthy, Ebert thought "the central performance is an anthology of Chevy Chase mannerisms in search of a character." Vincent Canby in his review for The New York Times praised Chase's performance, writing, "He manages simultaneously to act the material with a good deal of nonchalance and to float above it, as if he wanted us to know that he knows that the whole enterprise is somewhat less than transcendental." Time magazine's Richard Schickel wrote, "In Fletch, the quick, smartly paced, gags somehow read as signs of vulnerability. Incidentally, they add greatly to the movie's suspense. Every minute you expect the hero's loose lip to be turned into a fat one." In his review for the Chicago Reader, Dave Kehr wrote, "Chase and Ritchie make a strong, natural combination: the union of their two flip, sarcastic personalities produces a fairly definitive example of the comic style of the 80s, grounded in detachment, underreaction, and cool contempt for rhetorically overblown authority figures."

Neil Gaiman reviewed Fletch for Imagine magazine, stating that it is "a very enjoyable detective comedy starring Chevy Chase as an undercover reporter who gets mixed up in a murder plot. Not as good as the Greg Mcdonald book it's based on."

Home media
Fletch was originally released on DVD in 1998, but that release quickly went out of print. Universal Home Video re-released a special edition of Fletch — the "Jane Doe" Edition on May 1, 2007. The film is presented in 1.85:1 anamorphic widescreen, along with an English Dolby Digital 5.1 Surround track and includes the retrospective featurettes, "Just Charge It to the Underhills: Making and Remembering Fletch," "From John Coctoastan To Harry S. Truman: The Disguises" and "Favorite Fletch Moments." IGN felt that this version was a decent replacement for anyone who still owned the film on VHS, but for "anyone seeking more than that will be sadly disappointed by the ill-executed extras and slap-dash sound upgrade."

Additionally, the film was also the next-to-last to be released by Universal on the HD DVD format, March 11, 2008, and later released on Blu-ray disc on June 2, 2009.

Legacy
Fletch became a cult film. In an interview for the New York Post, Bergman tried to explain its appeal: "It's so bizarre, but Fletch strikes a chord. There's a group of movies like that in the '80s, like Caddyshack, too, that captured a certain wise-ass thing." In particular, the film appeals to college students who have asked Chase to talk about it at film classes. The actor has said that the appeal of the character is "the cheekiness of the guy ... everybody at that age would like to be as quick-witted as Fletch, and as uncaring about what others think." Chase has said that this film is his favorite to date because "it allowed me to be myself. Fletch was the first one with me really winging it. Even though there was a script, the director allowed me to just go, and in many ways, I was directing the comedy." Perhaps the most meaningful praise comes from Mcdonald himself: "I watched it recently, and I think Chevy and Michael Ritchie did a good job with it."

In 2008, the film was voted the 23rd best film set in Los Angeles in the previous 25 years by a group of Los Angeles Times writers and editors, with two criteria: "The movie had to communicate some inherent truth about the L.A. experience, and only one film per director was allowed on the list."

The 2005 animated feature Hoodwinked!, a parody of the Little Red Riding Hood story, depicts the Big Bad Wolf as a sarcastic investigative reporter in a direct parody of Fletch, right up to the Lakers shirt, disguises, and a version of Fletch's theme playing during his scenes.

Sequel and reboot
The film was followed by a 1989 sequel, Fletch Lives.

A follow-up to Fletch Lives had been discussed in the 1990s at Universal Studios. During his association with Universal after the production of Mallrats (this was because Gramercy Pictures, which released Mallrats, was co-owned by Universal), Kevin Smith expressed interest in doing a third "Fletch" film as a sequel starring Chevy Chase, but it never came to fruition. In June 2000, it was announced that Kevin Smith was set to write and direct a Fletch film at Miramax Films, after the rights to the books, which Universal Studios had owned, reverted. At the time, Miramax co-head Harvey Weinstein expressed the hope that a new Fletch series would be "Miramax Films' first-ever series."

After a disagreement between Chase and Smith in regard to differing levels of priority for the sequel project, Smith settled on adapting Fletch Won, which follows Fletch in his early years as a newspaper junior reporter. Smith intended to follow the novel's plot and characters much more closely than earlier Fletch films had. Filming the prequel/origin story would have allowed Smith to make the movie without Chase, while still leaving the door open for him to appear in a cameo role in framing scenes and/or as narrator. Around this time, Smith mentioned Jason Lee and Ben Affleck as possible choices to play Fletch.

In August 2003, it was reported that the film was set to start shooting in January, with Smith still at the helm. Though Smith insisted on casting Lee in the lead role, Miramax head Harvey Weinstein refused to take a chance on Lee, citing the general inability of his films to gross more than $30 million at the box office. The role of Fletch remained uncast, with Smith considering a list of actors including Affleck, Brad Pitt, and Jimmy Fallon. Though Smith considered compromising and casting Zach Braff in the role, he eventually left the project in October 2005.

Smith was replaced as writer/director by Scrubs creator Bill Lawrence, in what would have been his directorial debut. He had enthused, "Not only can I recite the original Fletch movie line for line, I actually read all the Greg Mcdonald books as a kid. Consider me obsessed — I'm going to try as hard as I can not to screw this up." Lawrence was signed to direct both Fletch Won and a sequel. Scrubs star Zach Braff was rumored to be in talks for the lead role, and in January 2007, Braff posted on his website that "Bill Lawrence is writing and directing Fletch in the spring and he wants me to play young Fletch, but no firm plans are in place yet. He is still writing the script." In April 2007, Braff announced that he had dropped out of the film to work on his own film, a remake of Open Hearts. In June 2007, it was announced that Lawrence was off the project and had been replaced by Steve Pink.

In 2011, rights to the project were purchased by Warner Bros., who requested screenplays from several writers that turned out to be unsuitable. In 2013, David List, who represents the McDonald estate, stepped in with his own draft, which proved attractive enough to engage Jason Sudeikis in the title role. The studio signed off on the screenplay, described as more of a "gritty action comedy with heart", and has begun looking for a director. In April 2015, the purposed film moved to Relativity Studios after Warner Bros. passed on the idea. However, Relativity Media went bankrupt later that year and again in 2018.

In July 2020, it was announced that a reboot was back on at Miramax. Based on the second book in the Fletch series, Confess, Fletch, Jon Hamm spearheaded the project as both star and producer, with Greg Mottola directing and Zev Borow writing. Confess, Fletch began filming in June 2021. It was released in a limited theatrical run and on premium video on demand on September 16, 2022, followed by a Showtime premiere on October 28, 2022. 
The remake received positive reviews from critics, with particular praise being given to Jon Hamm's performance as Irwin "Fletch" Fletcher.

References

External links

 
 
 
 
 Fletch at The Numbers

1985 films
American comedy thriller films
1980s crime comedy films
1980s mystery films
American crime comedy films
American mystery films
American neo-noir films
Comedy mystery films
Films about journalists
Films based on American novels
Films based on mystery novels
Films directed by Michael Ritchie
Films set in Los Angeles
Films set in Utah
Films shot in Utah
Universal Pictures films
Films scored by Harold Faltermeyer
1985 comedy films
Films with screenplays by Andrew Bergman
1980s English-language films
1980s American films